Jonathan Sherr (born April 24, 1974) is an American actor known for his portrayal of Tony László in My Darling Is a Foreigner. He played the role of Mardock in Tokyo Bandwagon.

Filmography

Live action
English Teacher - Tom
Love in Tokyo - Tom
My Darling Is a Foreigner - Tom Lazlo
Tokyo Bandwagon - Murdock
"Prime Japan"- Amazon

Video games
NightCry - Jerome

References

1974 births
Living people
American male film actors
American male television actors
American male video game actors
American male voice actors
American expatriates in Japan
21st-century American male actors